Egon Bondy's Happy Hearts Club Banned is an album by Czech underground band The Plastic People of the Universe. It was recorded in 1974/75, mainly at Houska Castle, enabled by the castle's then warden Svatopluk Karásek, with some songs being recorded in Prague. The album could not be officially released and distributed under the former Communist regime in Czechoslovakia; instead fans duplicated tapes with one another, often resulting in poor technical quality. It was released in 1978 in France by SCOPA Invisible Production. In the Czech Republic a remastered version was published in 2001 by Globus Music. The album title is a parody of The Beatles' album Sgt. Pepper's Lonely Hearts Club Band. Most of the songs on the record are settings of poems by Egon Bondy. The author of the album title is Ivan Hartl, a Czechoslovak emigrant living in London.

Music critic Robert Christgau named the album one of the few import-only records he loved yet omitted from Christgau's Record Guide: Rock Albums of the Seventies (1981).

Track listing
All music composed by Milan Hlavsa; texts are listed.
"Dvacet" (lyrics: Egon Bondy)
"Zácpa" (lyrics: Egon Bondy)
"Toxika" (lyrics: Egon Bondy)
"Magické noci" (lyrics: Egon Bondy)
"M.G.M." (instrumental)
"Okolo okna" (lyrics: Egon Bondy)
"Elegie" (lyrics: Egon Bondy)
"Podivuhodný mandarin" (lyrics: Egon Bondy)
"Nikdo" (lyrics: Egon Bondy)
"Jó-to se ti to spí" (lyrics: Egon Bondy)
"Já a Mike" (lyrics: Kurt Vonnegut; translated to Czech by Jaroslav Kořán)
"Ranní ptáče" (lyrics: Egon Bondy)
"Francovka" (lyrics: Egon Bondy)
"Jednou nohou" (instrumental)
"Spofa blues" (lyrics: Egon Bondy)
"Apokalyptickej pták" (lyrics: Pavel Zajíček)
"Píseň brance" (lyrics: František Pánek)

Personnel
Milan Hlavsa – bass guitar, vocals
Josef Janíček – claviphone, guitar, vibraphone, vocals
Jiří Kabeš – violin, vocals
Vratislav Brabenec – alt saxophone
Jiří Šula – drums
Jaroslav Vožniak – drums
Vasil Šnajdr – flute
Zdeněk Fišer – theremin

References

The Plastic People of the Universe albums
1978 albums
2001 albums